A list of films produced in France in 1991.

See also
1991 in France

References

External links
 French films of 1991 at the Internet Movie Database
French films of 1991 at Cinema-francais.fr

1991
Films
French